The Network Effect is a 2020 science fiction fantasy novel written by Martha Wells. It is the fifth in the Murderbot series and the first full-length book. It was winner of the 2021 Hugo Award for Best Novel.

Premise 
Murderbot has been sent by Dr. Mensah on a research expedition that includes her daughter Amena, her brother-in-law Thiago, and Drs. Arada, Overse, and Ratthi. Their ship is set upon by a hostile transport vessel, which Murderbot and Amena are compelled to board as the others flee in an escape pod. As the transport moves into a nearby wormhole, Murderbot hunts the grey-skinned humanoids in control of the ship, isolates Amena and the human captives Ras and Eletra in a safe zone, and begins to realize that the transport is the same one once controlled by its robot pilot friend ART. Arada and the others, who have followed the ship into the wormhole, are able to board as Murderbot finishes off the hostiles and manages to reload a deleted ART with a code phrase left for it. As Murderbot guessed, after being invaded by the grey raiders, ART sent them after the SecUnit ostensibly for use as a weapon, but really because ART determined that Murderbot could overcome them. Murderbot is enraged that ART would endanger the SecUnit's humans this way, and is further annoyed when ART insists that Murderbot and its  human crew help find and recover the transport vessel's missing crew. Murderbot and its team descend to the planetary colony that seems to be at the center of the situation, and find that the colonists have been exposed to alien remnant contamination. They have developed the grey skin condition to varying degrees, and have separated into warring factions representing the least contaminated versus the most, who seem controlled by an alien hive mind. The missing crew have effected their own escape, and while Arada and her people help them, Murderbot is captured. ART begins firing missiles at the colony, demanding its release. Murderbot is rescued with the help of another SecUnit whose governor module it disabled, as well as a software version of itself set loose on the colony's defenses. The group returns to Preservation, and Murderbot decides to accompany ART and its  crew on their next mission.

Reviews 
It was described as "... if the first books were episodes in a four-part TV miniseries, then 'Network Effect' is the feature-length movie with the bigger budget and scope, and it is no less enjoyable." and a "wonderful continuation of the series". It was also described as "a perfectly paced space opera adventure novel, one in which Murderbot continues to grow as a person."

References 

American science fiction novels
2020 American novels
Hugo Award for Best Novel-winning works